Silicon alkoxides are a group of alkoxides, chemical compounds of silicon and an alcohol, with the formula .

Silicon alkoxides are important precursors for the manufacture of silica-based aerogels.

References

Alkoxides
Silicate esters